Saint-Julien-en-Quint (Vivaro-Alpine: Sant Julian de Quint) is a commune in the Drôme department located in southeastern France.

Population

See also
Communes of the Drôme department
Parc naturel régional du Vercors

References

Communes of Drôme